Lucas de Lima Tagliapietra (born 5 November 1990), known simply as Lucas, is a Brazilian professional football player who plays for Portuguese club Penafiel  as a defender.

Career
Born in Alegrete, Rio Grande do Sul, Lucas began his career in the state with Santa Cruz in 2010. He then played for TSW Pegasus FC, where he was twice Hong Kong league runner-up, and once a domestic cup finalist. After that he moved to Moldova's FC Dacia Chișinău, and in 2013 transferred to another team in their league, FC Milsami. He left the club when they were in fifth position.

Lucas signed for Scottish club Hamilton Academical on a one-year contract on 30 January 2015. He made his debut in the Scottish Premiership on 22 February, replacing Martin Canning for the last seven minutes of a 4–0 defeat away to league leaders Celtic. On 16 May he scored his first goal for the club, heading in Ali Crawford's corner to open an eventual 2–1 loss away to Ross County. After breaking into the first-team he extended his contract with the club in May 2015, until the end of the 2015–16 season.

Lucas left The Accies in July 2016, and signed a contract with Boavista F.C. as a free agent. He scored his first goal for the club in the first day of the season, in a 2–0 home win against Arouca on 14 August. On 18 September, his errors led to both goals in a 2–1 loss to Feirense also at the Estádio do Bessa; the latter was a handball that denied a goal for Platiny and earned a red card. Manager Erwin Sánchez said that the blame for the defeat was shared across the whole team, not just Lucas.

In June 2017, Lucas returned to South America when he signed a four-year deal at LDU Quito in Ecuador, who purchased 50% of his economic rights.

After a year at Al Batin FC in the Saudi Professional League, Lucas returned to Boavista on a two-year deal in July 2019. He left again after one season and signed a contract of the same length for Portimonense in September 2020.

On 27 July 2021 he moved to Penafiel in Liga Portugal 2.

Personal life
Lucas also has an Italian passport, allowing him to play in the United Kingdom without a work permit.

References

External links

1990 births
People from Alegrete
Living people
Brazilian footballers
Brazilian people of Italian descent
Brazilian expatriate footballers
Association football defenders
TSW Pegasus FC players
Hamilton Academical F.C. players
FC Dacia Chișinău players
FC Milsami Orhei players
L.D.U. Quito footballers
Al Batin FC players
Boavista F.C. players
Portimonense S.C. players
F.C. Penafiel players
Primeira Liga players
Liga Portugal 2 players
Hong Kong First Division League players
Ecuadorian Serie A players
Scottish Professional Football League players
Saudi Professional League players
Moldovan Super Liga players
Brazilian expatriate sportspeople in Hong Kong
Brazilian expatriate sportspeople in Moldova
Brazilian expatriate sportspeople in Scotland
Brazilian expatriate sportspeople in Portugal
Brazilian expatriate sportspeople in Ecuador
Brazilian expatriate sportspeople in Saudi Arabia
Expatriate footballers in Hong Kong
Expatriate footballers in Moldova
Expatriate footballers in Portugal
Expatriate footballers in Scotland
Expatriate footballers in Ecuador
Expatriate footballers in Saudi Arabia
Sportspeople from Rio Grande do Sul